Huang Yuandong (born 27 February 1989) is a Chinese footballer currently playing as a goalkeeper for Zibo Qisheng in China League Two.

Career statistics

Club
.

References

1989 births
Living people
Chinese footballers
Association football goalkeepers
China League Two players
China League One players
Zhejiang Professional F.C. players
Xinjiang Tianshan Leopard F.C. players